Sparganothoides is a genus of moths belonging to the subfamily Tortricinae of the family Tortricidae.

Species
aciculana species group
Sparganothoides aciculana Kruse & Powell, 2009
Sparganothoides broccusana Kruse & Powell, 2009
Sparganothoides cornutana Kruse & Powell, 2009
Sparganothoides silaceana Kruse & Powell, 2009
hydeana species group
Sparganothoides amitana Kruse & Powell, 2009
Sparganothoides audentiana Kruse & Powell, 2009
Sparganothoides calthograptana Kruse & Powell, 2009
Sparganothoides canities Kruse & Powell, 2009
Sparganothoides coloratana Kruse & Powell, 2009
Sparganothoides hydeana (Klots, 1936)
Sparganothoides laderana Kruse & Powell, 2009
Sparganothoides machimiana (Barnes & Busck, 1920)
lentiginosana species group
Sparganothoides lentiginosana (Walsingham, 1879)
morata species group
Sparganothoides albescens (Walsingham, 1913)
Sparganothoides morata (Walsingham, 1913)
Sparganothoides polymitariana Kruse & Powell, 2009
Sparganothoides prolesana Kruse & Powell, 2009
Sparganothoides torusana Kruse & Powell, 2009
ocrisana species group
Sparganothoides arcuatana Kruse & Powell, 2009
Sparganothoides canorisana Kruse & Powell, 2009
Sparganothoides capitiornata Kruse & Powell, 2009
Sparganothoides licrosana Kruse & Powell, 2009
Sparganothoides ocrisana Kruse & Powell, 2009
Sparganothoides probolosana Kruse & Powell, 2009
Sparganothoides umbosana Kruse & Powell, 2009
Sparganothoides xenopsana Kruse & Powell, 2009
teratana species group
Sparganothoides carycrosana Kruse & Powell, 2009
Sparganothoides castanea (Walsingham, 1913)
Sparganothoides lugens (Walsingham, 1913)
Sparganothoides plemmelana Kruse & Powell, 2009
Sparganothoides teratana (Zeller, 1877)
Sparganothoides vinolenta (Walsingham, 1913)

Former species
Sparganothoides schausiana (Walsingham, 1913)
Sparganothoides spadicea (Walsingham, 1913)

See also
 List of Tortricidae genera

References

 , 2005, World Catalogue of Insects, 5
 , 1986, in Powell, Pan-Pacif.Ent. 62: 375
 ;  2009: Systematics of Sparganothoides Lambert and Powell, 1986 (Lepidoptera: Tortricidae: Sparganothini). Zootaxa, 2150: 1-78. Abstract & excerpt
  2012: Description of Amorbimorpha Kruse, new genus, from Mexico and the southern United States (Lepidoptera: Tortricidae: Sparganothini). Zootaxa, 3177: 33–42. Preview

External links
 tortricidae.com

 
Sparganothini
Tortricidae genera